The H Line, part of the light rail system operated by the Regional Transportation District in the Denver-Aurora Metropolitan Area in Colorado, was added to the system on November 17, 2006, with the completion of the Southeast Corridor project (the "T-Rex Project"). It is one of four routes that are part of the RTD's service plan for the corridor.

The line was extended to reach Florida station on February 24, 2017 along with the opening of the R line.

According to a map in the RTD's service plan for the corridor, the H Line's color is blue.

From the start of each day, the H Line begins its service southbound at Evans station to Florida Station. At the end of the service, the H Line terminates its service at I-25 & Broadway station.

Route 
The H Line's northern terminus is at 18th and California in downtown Denver. It shares track with the  L Line (RTD) in Downtown Denver (Stout and California Street Stations) and the D Line and F Line (RTD) until it reaches I-25 & Broadway station, then follows the Southeast Corridor to a junction past Southmoor Station, and follows the I-225 branch of the system to Southeast terminus at Florida station in Aurora.

Stations

FasTracks 

Work began in 2012, and the two station extension was combined with I-225 corridor light-rail line in 2013. Construction was long expected to be completed in 2016, however opening was delayed until February 24, 2017.

References

External links 

RTD H Line Schedule

RTD light rail
Transportation in Arapahoe County, Colorado
Transportation in Aurora, Colorado
750 V DC railway electrification
Railway lines opened in 2006
Railway lines in highway medians